Euryplatea nanaknihali is the world's smallest fly, measuring  in size.

Due to its small size, the viscosity of air is problematic for the insect, and even the smallest air currents are a large impediment. Scientists expressed amazement that such a tiny animal could still have all the organs of a normal insect.

They are believed to lay their eggs in the heads of small Crematogaster ants.  The larva consumes the interior of the ant's head, within whose exoskeleton it pupates, before emerging as an adult.

The species has been found in a number of national parks in Thailand. It is named after Nanak Nihal Weiss, a boy interested in insects who frequented the Natural History Museum of Los Angeles County with his father.

References

Insects of Thailand
Phoridae
Insects described in 2012